Gymnopilus dryophilus is a species of mushroom in the family Hymenogastraceae. This species is found in North America.

See also

List of Gymnopilus species

References

dryophilus
Fungi of North America
Fungi described in 1943